The second season of the American streaming television series Daredevil, which is based on the Marvel Comics character of the same name, follows Matt Murdock / Daredevil, a blind lawyer-by-day who fights crime at night, crossing paths with the deadly Frank Castle / Punisher along with the return of an old girlfriend—Elektra Natchios. It is set in the Marvel Cinematic Universe (MCU), sharing continuity with the films and other television series of the franchise. The season is produced by Marvel Television in association with ABC Studios, with Doug Petrie and Marco Ramirez serving as showrunners, and series creator Drew Goddard acting as consultant.

Charlie Cox stars as Murdock, while Jon Bernthal and Élodie Yung are introduced as Castle and Natchios, respectively. Deborah Ann Woll, Elden Henson, Rosario Dawson, and Vincent D'Onofrio also return from the first season, with Stephen Rider joining them. The season was ordered in April 2015 after the successful release of the first, with Petrie and Ramirez replacing the season one showrunner Steven S. DeKnight. Production on the season began in July 2015 and continued through December, with the season focusing on the nature of heroism through comparison of Murdock to Castle and Natchios, and showing how the latter two affect Murdock's life. 

The first two episodes of the season premiered in Paris on March 7, 2016, with the full season of 13 episodes released on Netflix on March 18. Critics praised the introduction of Castle and Natchios, as well as Bernthal's performance in particular, the season's action, and storylines. However, many missed the presence of Vondie Curtis-Hall's Ben Urich from season one, and D'Onofrio's Wilson Fisk during the first half of season two. The series was renewed for a third season in July 2016.

Episodes

Cast and characters

Main
 Charlie Cox as Matt Murdock / Daredevil
 Deborah Ann Woll as Karen Page
 Elden Henson as Franklin "Foggy" Nelson
 Jon Bernthal as Frank Castle / Punisher
 Élodie Yung as Elektra Natchios
 Stephen Rider as Blake Tower
 Rosario Dawson as Claire Temple
 Vincent D'Onofrio as Wilson Fisk / Kingpin

Recurring
 Royce Johnson as Brett Mahoney
 Susan Varon as Josie
 Michelle Hurd as Samantha Reyes
 Marilyn Torres as Louisa Delgado
 Geoffrey Cantor as Mitchell Ellison
 Ron Nakahara as Hirochi
 John Pirkis as Stan Gibson
 Scott Glenn as Stick
 Peter Shinkoda as Nobu Yoshioka

Notable guests
 Rob Morgan as Turk Barrett
 Matt Gerald as Melvin Potter
 Peter McRobbie as Paul Lantom
 Amy Rutberg as Marci Stahl
 Kevin Nagle as Roscoe Sweeney
 Wai Ching Ho as Gao
 Suzanne H. Smart as Shirley Benson
 Carrie-Anne Moss as Jeri Hogarth

Production

Development
When asked about the future of the series following the first season, showrunner Steven S. DeKnight said that Daredevil "is one part of the bigger plan—Jessica Jones, Luke Cage, Iron Fist, and then The Defenders. How that all fits together, and whether or not there will be a second season of this show—or if it will fold into the others—are questions nobody really has answers to yet." In November 2014, DeKnight said that there "probably will be more" seasons of Daredevil following the first. In January 2015, Netflix COO Ted Sarandos stated the series was "eligible to go into multiple seasons for sure" and Netflix would look at "how well [they] are addressing both the Marvel fanbase but also the broader fanbase" to determine if additional seasons would be appropriate.

On April 21, 2015, Marvel and Netflix announced that the series had been renewed for a second season, with Doug Petrie and Marco Ramirez replacing DeKnight as showrunners as well as acting as executive producers; both served as writers in the first season and worked closely with DeKnight and series creator Drew Goddard. The season introduces the Punisher, whom DeKnight and the writers had wanted to introduce in a post-credits scene during the first-season finale but were unable due to the way that Netflix begins the next episode during the credits of the current one. DeKnight felt that this "was the right decision. I think there's a better, more organic way to introduce him to the world." Ramirez referred to the second season internally as "Daredevil vs. the Punisher". In September 2015, Goddard explained that he was still involved with the season as an executive producer, consulting with Petrie and Ramirez when asked to. The season consists of 13-hour-long episodes.

Writing

Ramirez talked about how the second season would be different from the first, saying that the writers had spent the first season wondering "if there was a place for dark and gritty content in superheroes" and because of the positive fan reaction to that ("we got a loud answer of 'yes'"), approached the second season with the mindset, "you wanted grounded and wanted dark, here's Elektra and Punisher. You asked for it." Petrie, talking about the potential use of flashbacks in the season, said that sometimes it is best to "peel back the layer of the onion through flashback, or two people in a room talking can have all the power in the world. That's something we get to pick and choose."

On including the Punisher specifically in the season, where he is introduced to the Marvel Cinematic Universe, Goddard felt television was the best fit for the character, as the writers are "able to do things on the small screen that fit that character better than if we had to water him down for the movies." Goddard stated that the season's approach to the characters and their actions would be to do what makes sense for the characters rather than "pushing the boundary" or looking to shock the audience, though he noted that this could still go in a more "adult...darker, dirtier" way due to the freedom of Netflix and the presence of characters such as the Punisher. Petrie stated that the writers hoped to "stir the pot" and "get people to think" with the inclusion of the Punisher and his lethal methods, adding, "Taking lethal justice into your own hands in America in 2015 is tricky shit. We have not shied away from the rich complicated reality of Now. If you've got a gun and you're not the police you're going to incite strong feelings." Ramirez added that Castle was not referred to as "Punisher" in the writer's room, similarly to Wilson Fisk not being called "Kingpin" for season one, as it allowed the writers to think "about [Castle] as a man with a vendetta, who made an oath to his dead family. The more specific it got, the less it became about issues outside of Hell's Kitchen or other things." In the series, the moniker of "The Punisher" is given to Castle by the media due to his aggressive actions.

For the timing of introducing the new characters, the showrunners decided to introduce the Punisher immediately and hold back on Elektra briefly, with Ramirez explaining that "one of the pitfalls when we have this many great characters to play with is wanting to throw them at the wall", but it was important to take the time to introduce the new characters properly to the audience, particularly to the people who weren't already familiar with them. Elaborating on the aim to keep the story focused on Murdock, Petrie revealed that the writers would often come up with "amazing stuff" for the season, but then realize that they had forgotten about Murdock and had to "completely turn it over and look at how this affects Matt and filter it through that prism." Ramirez added,It could easily become The Punisher story or the Elektra story that Matt cameos in, and not vice versa. So, we built it like a Matt story, in terms of what we wanted to put him through, where we wanted to get him, by the end of the season, and what we wanted to have him learn about himself, and we used an Elektra and Frank story throughout, to get him there... we talked about when we watch shows in 13 episode stretches, how do we watch them? What is an exciting structure that we would like to think about here? Do we divide it right down the middle? Do we do a three-act structure?...If you were to sit and watch 13 episodes, you would absolutely feel a structure, much like in the comics. That's what we did this season.

Charlie Cox explained that with Wilson Fisk imprisoned following the first season, season two picks up with "the crime rate [having] plummeted. Things have returned to normal, if not better than normal", which is when Punisher is introduced, who makes Matt Murdock "question everything. Matt has to reevaluate  and what he does". Jeph Loeb, head of Marvel Television, said that "if season one was really about Matt's decision to become a hero, then season two really became about what is it to be a hero." By introducing the Punisher and Elektra, the writers were able to "push and pull" on Murdock, contrasting their three ideologies—the Punisher seeing "justice in a very black-and-white kind of way", and Elektra living "more in the gray". On Elektra in particular, Loeb said that she has a very clear, self-motivated agenda, and she challenges Murdock's own agenda and "quest for justice. Who are you doing this for? Why are you doing this? What's the end goal that you're trying to achieve?" More backstory and story arcs had been created for the characters Nobu and Gao, but this was not used, which Nobu actor Peter Shinkoda attributes to Loeb not caring about Asian people.

Casting
Charlie Cox, Deborah Ann Woll, Elden Henson, Rosario Dawson, and Vincent D'Onofrio return from the first season as Matt Murdock / Daredevil, Karen Page, Franklin "Foggy" Nelson, Claire Temple, and Wilson Fisk / Kingpin, respectively. In June 2015, Jon Bernthal was cast as Frank Castle / Punisher, and Élodie Yung was cast as Elektra a month later. In September, Stephen Rider joined the cast as Blake Tower.

Also returning from season one are Royce Johnson as Brett Mahoney, Susan Varon as Josie, Geoffrey Cantor as Mitchell Ellison, Scott Glenn as Stick, Peter Shinkoda as Nobu Yoshioka, Rob Morgan as Turk Barrett, Matt Gerald as Melvin Potter, Peter McRobbie as Father Paul Lantom, Amy Rutberg as Marci Stahl, Kevin Nagle as Roscoe Sweeney, Wai Ching Ho as Gao, and Suzanne H. Smart as Shirley Benson. Ron Nakahara, John Pirkis, and Marilyn Torres have recurring roles as Hirochi, Stan Gibson, and Louisa Delgado, respectively, while Michelle Hurd and Carrie-Anne Moss reprise their Jessica Jones roles of Samantha Reyes and Jeri Hogarth.

Design
Joshua Shaw designed costumes for characters in the season. Petrie stated that more layers were added to the series' atmosphere to keep the season dark but provide more clarity to the viewer, an issue that occurred in the first season. Petrie also talked about the costumes for characters such as Elektra, noting that they had to not only look at the comics and "what looks cool", but also "what would you really fight in? What would protect you?...will people be wearing kick ass costumes in this show? At some point, everybody does. We promise. But, that said, we want to make them feel as organic and grounded as possible.

Lorraine Calvert joined the series as costume designer for the season. On adapting Elektra's costume for the season, which in the comics usually consists of impractically "strappy" red cloth, Calvert decided to make it utilitarian and appealing, while still being faithful to the comics. Originally starting out opposite of the eventual sleek design for both her fighting and daytime attire, Calvert said, "Ideas were tossed around about how she was possibly bohemian, [because] she was a free spirit who traveled all over the world with as much money as she possibly could." This eventually led to the final, sleeker design, because Elektra "really needs a very simple, elegant line because too much cloth is overwhelming." The costume consisted of "black moto pants, a one-piece zippered body suit, a sleeveless vest, and red cloth to provide the highlights and the hood covering Elektra's face." The shade of the red used for Elektra throughout the season was chosen so it would not clash with the red in Daredevil's costume, as well as to match the darker tone of the series.

Daredevil's costume was also upgraded in the season, with Calvert calling it "a much more fluid suit and much more tactical in a way." The costume department "streamlined" the suit to make it simpler, using less material on the gauntlets and boots. Cox described it as a "delicate area" that required some "tweaks" after the brief use of it at the end of the first season. He noted that the changes are weaved into the storyline of the season, including the need for a new, redesigned mask, and a lower-half of the suit that is closer to the original cargo pants that the character wore earlier in the previous season. These baggier pants gave Cox and his stunt double much more maneuverability.

Filming
Production on the season began in July 2015 in East Harlem, with the working title Ringside, and a nine-day-per-episode schedule. Filming locations included the Metro Theater; Roosevelt Island; Greenpoint, Brooklyn; Long Island City; SoHo for exterior shots of Murdock's apartment; Newtown Creek; the Forest Park Carousel; Bayside, Queens for Castle's old home; Green-Wood Cemetery and Catacombs; East Village; the Bronx County Courthouse; Tribeca; Hell's Kitchen; the Brooklyn Navy Yard; Fort Totten and tunnels inside Bayley Seton Hospital for when Murdock confronts the Hand; and Calvary Cemetery. Filming ended in December 2015.

Martin Ahlgren joined the series as director of photography for the season, deciding to "go in a slightly different direction" than the first season, but retaining "the yellowish street light color that gave season one a very distinct style". Ahlgren filmed season two in 4K resolution on RED Dragon cameras, and tried to use in-shot lighting such as lamps and car headlights, as well as "4×4 Light Blankets—flexible sheets of LED that was small enough to fit into tight locations and light enough that it could be taped to a wall, yet outputs a very nice soft light that can be adjusted from daylight to tungsten color". Ahlgren highlighted the car chase at the beginning of "Guilty as Sin" as a challenge, noting the many ninjas chasing the car, and the one that "jumps up on the car and travels on the roof for a block", with all the stunts filmed on location. An Ultimate Arm, "a motorized crane mounted on a Porsche Cayenne", was used for the sequence, a break from the series' usual handheld and steadicam operations. The chase was shot over two nights in Greenpoint, Brooklyn, with the interior of the car then filmed on a green screen stage, a rarity for the series, "to give the actors a better environment to act in".

On the season's fight sequences and choreography, Bernthal said, "The fights are all character-driven and the fights tell a story." Cox added that "there is absolutely an attempt to make sure every punch or kick that is thrown is like a line of dialogue; there is motive behind it, there is reason behind it, it means something." Cox's stunt double, Chris Brewster, explained how the series' fight choreography has evolved, with the first season having shown Murdock just starting out as a vigilante—"he fought with all heart and soul, but wasn't a polished fighter....he was more raw and gritty"—while the second season sees the character having learned from previous mistakes—"his style is more defined and thought out now, but he will always fight with the Daredevil flair". As for the fighting styles of Punisher and Elektra, Brewster said that because of the Punisher's military background he uses a lot of weapons, and his "hand to hand style is more of a close quarter combat nature", while Elektra was trained by Stick and the Hand, so she has similar movement to Daredevil who was also trained by Stick. "However," Brewster continued, "The Hand are trained assassins who are all about stealth takeouts and quick kills. Her style shows elements of" that as well. The season uses multiple different martial art styles, including kali, Chinese kung fu, wing chun, kenjutsu, and boxing.

The one-take fight in "New York's Finest" in which Daredevil fights gang members down a staircase was described by Cox as "kind of like an homage" to the first season's well received one-take hallway fight scene, and "almost like that scene on crack". Silvera noted that it is a metaphorical "descent into Hell" rather than a "test of will" like the first season's scene. The stunt team had three days to prepare the fight, and the final sequence was filmed in a day and a half. Unlike the first season's scene, which was shot on a set and used a camera mounted on a ceiling track, the stairwell sequence was filmed on location, and required the camera to be passed around multiple people to get the final shot. The season includes another homage to the hallway scene in "Seven Minutes in Heaven", where the Punisher has his own hallway fight. Silvera noted that this "full-blown", murdering Punisher was "a strong contrast to Daredevil". For all the season's fights, the stunt team filmed a previsualization version using stunt doubles, with the actors, such as Cox, then shown this in sections on the day of filming, and allowed to make adjustments where necessary. Though the actors completed the majority of the fights, doubles were used for flips and major stunts.

Visual effects
Shade VFX returns from the first season to work on the visual effects for the series.

Music
By September 2015, John Paesano had begun composing music for the season. He felt that the season's new showrunners "were true to what we were trying to do in season one. There were just elements in season two that we had to acknowledge" such as the Punisher and Elektra. He jokingly said that "it's not like we all of the sudden went into John Williams territory, you know? It's definitely still dark, still gritty ... but it definitely jumps up a couple levels." When approaching the characters of Punisher and Elektra, with whom Paesano was familiar from the comics and previous adaptations, he "took all those preconceived notions I had with a grain of salt" and waited to see what the season's interpretation of the characters would be. Paesano worked closely with the series' sound design team, spotting episodes with them to coordinate where "we were going to hit what" and "maintain that definable aspect of New York" and its sound. A soundtrack album for the season was released digitally by Hollywood Records on July 15, 2016.

All music composed by John Paesano, unless otherwise noted.

Marvel Cinematic Universe tie-ins
On references to the larger MCU, Ramirez said "those little Easter eggs that come along the way are fun", but there were times when the writers did not take opportunities to reference the rest of the universe because they felt like distractions from the series' narrative and characters. Petrie stated that the writers wanted to "keep it in Hell's Kitchen" and focus on issues such as "the air conditioner doesn't work at Nelson and Murdock. That's really what we're interested in." He explained that the real life New York City "has a larger than life presence" with celebrities that live there—"If you see Derek Jeter walking down the street, that's great, but then you turn the corner and you get into an argument with the guy who overcharged you for a pretzel. We want our guys to be real New Yorkers."

The season features the motorcycle gang Dogs of Hell, who were first introduced through their Nevada chapter in the Agents of S.H.I.E.L.D. episode "Yes Men", and Roxxon Energy Corporation, a company featured throughout the MCU. It also mentions the vigilantes Jessica Jones and Luke Cage, the death of Oscar Clemons, and the law firm Hogarth, Chao, and Benowitz, which are all references to the first season of Jessica Jones. When Claire Temple first appears in the season, she has "a cut in her eyebrow", which Cox was told would be explained in Luke Cage, saying, "the timeline had been thought through and worked out so that whatever's going on in Luke Cage ... somehow at some point during that show, the next day she's in the hospital talking to me."

Marketing
Footage from the season was shown at New York Comic Con in October 2015, and at Comic Con Experience that December. On February 15, 2016, the first part of the season trailer was released focusing on the Punisher, while the second part focusing on Elektra was released 10 days later, on February 25. Scott Mendelson of Forbes felt the first part is "clearly going for a vibe similar to that first full-length Dark Knight teaser back in December of 2007, with Castle being framed as a natural byproduct of/reaction to Daredevil's own vigilantism". He also appreciated that it appeared Castle would be presented as a villain, as the previous film adaptions of the character always had Castle "still a hero at the end." Mendelson's one drawback to the trailer was when Castle starts "monologue-ing" in the last third, feeling Bernthal "casts such an imposing and grim shadow as a near-silent angel of death that the [haunting and mythological] mood is almost broken". Joanna Robinson at Vanity Fair felt that the premise of the trailer, with Daredevil facing the Punisher, is "right in line with the big superhero trend this spring", comparing it to Captain America: Civil War and Batman v Superman: Dawn of Justice, which feature Captain America fighting Iron Man and Batman fighting Superman, respectively. Robinson wondered if, like those films, the season also has a separate, "bigger bad waiting in the wings to unite our vigilantes" that the trailer is hiding.

On March 7, 2016, the first two episodes of the season premiered in Paris, with a premiere in New York City on March 10. Also in early March, billboards were erected in Toronto featuring character posters for Daredevil, Punisher and Elektra. The series' Twitter account encouraged users to vote for which character was their favorite, with the other two receiving blood and bruises added to their billboards.

Release

Streaming
The second season of Daredevil was released on March 18, 2016 on the streaming service Netflix worldwide, in Ultra HD 4K. Preparing for the release, Netflix created eight different images to use as cover art for the season on its site. The images were randomly distributed among select subscribers, with Netflix tracking to see which one was the best-performing to eventually use for all subscribers. Netflix also debuted a countdown timer to a percentage of its users worldwide, allowing them to see how long it was until the season would debut. The season was enhanced to be available in high dynamic range after its initial release by post-production vendor Deluxe.

The season, along with the additional Daredevil seasons and the other Marvel Netflix series, was removed from Netflix on March 1, 2022, due to Netflix's license for the series ending and Disney regaining the rights. The season became available on Disney+ in the United States, Canada, United Kingdom, Ireland, Australia, and New Zealand on March 16, ahead of its debut in Disney+'s other markets by the end of 2022.

Home media
The season was released on DVD in Region 2 and Blu-ray in Region B on May 15, 2017, in Region 4 on June 14, 2017, and in Region 1 and Region A on August 22, 2017.

Reception

Audience viewership
As Netflix does not reveal subscriber viewership numbers for any of their original series, Symphony Technology Group compiled data for the season based on people using software on their phones that measures television viewing by detecting a program's sound. According to Symphony, the second season of Daredevil had 5.94% of viewers age 18-49 watching in an average minute in the first 32 days following its release. Symphony also estimated that 3.2 million viewers age 18-49 were watching an episode of Daredevil second season over the average minute in its first weekend of release. The marketing analytics firm Jumpshot determined the season was the most viewed Netflix season in the first 30 days after it premiered. Jumpshot, which "analyzes click-stream data from an online panel of more than 100 million consumers", looked at the viewing behavior and activity of the company's U.S. members, factoring in the relative number of U.S. Netflix viewers who watched at least one episode of the season.

Critical response

The review aggregator website Rotten Tomatoes reported an 81% approval rating with an average rating of 6.90/10 based on 57 reviews. The website's critical consensus reads, "Bolstered by some impressive action, Daredevil keeps its footing in season two, even if its new adversaries can't quite fill the void left by Wilson Fisk." Metacritic, which uses a weighted average, assigned a score of 68 out of 100, based on 13 critics, indicating "generally favorable reviews".

Reviewing the first seven episodes, Brian Lowry of Variety said, the season begins "on an uneven note", comparing some of the early moments to the works of Sam Peckinpah, "complete with slow-motion bullets and blood sprays. Stick with it, though, and the show blossoms, featuring a few terrific action sequences while introducing into this grim world seminal characters the Punisher and Elektra." Kevin Fitzpatrick of Screen Crush felt the first seven episodes of the season seemed "to have learned the best of both" from season one and Jessica Jones, "placing its most compelling imagery front and center straightaway, but still taking time to pick apart the characters beneath them, rather than shout platitudes about saving the city." He also praised the castings of Bernthal and Yung as Punisher and Elektra, respectively, and enjoyed "the improved spotlight" for Foggy and Karen, given the reduction of Dawson saying, "So many superhero series struggle to draw its supporting characters as compellingly as the action, and Daredevils particular blend of set piece and legal thriller feels inescapably original." However, Fitzpatrick did note the series lacked the presence Vondie Curtis-Hall brought as Ben Urich in the first season. He concluded that the season's progression "feels much cleaner" than the first's, "moving almost in acts more than back and forth victories...Even the aim feels that much more cohesive, to start in a place of Matt, Foggy and Karen all confident in their new roles, but wrestling with the consequence of their choice to always help the helpless." Merrill Barr of Forbes said, "Daredevil season two is very much the same excellent show Daredevil season one was...but in the places it isn't, it's also very much improved". Barr praised Bernthal as the Punisher, and noted the reduction in the amount of "thick blacks" in the cinematography that the first season was criticized for.

Collider's Chris Cabin also praised the first seven episodes of the season, giving it four stars, and saying that the series "finds overwhelmingly sincere and effective traces of humanity in a genre that has been hard-pressed to feel overtly pre-conceived in its political, societal, and philosophical ideas." He said Daredevil, like Jessica Jones, "feels like a show that is constantly evolving, and consistently searching for challenges." Cabin also felt that "the show's use of sound and image to infer or suggest as much as any line of dialogue...continues to set this series apart from its half-measured kin." He added that the season "goes to great lengths to make the stakes of" the moral and ethical issues, as seen by pitting Daredevil's methods against the Punisher, "intensely involving and thrilling," while also praising the action sequences of the season and the "streamlined focus on character in the writing", claiming that "none of the [MCU] films have even an iota of the seductive intimacy and heart of this show." Dennis Perkins writing for The A.V. Club awarded the season a "B+", missing D'Onofrio's "towering menace as Wilson Fisk", but feeling that Bernthal and Yung "make Castle and Elektra an effective season-long two-pronged assault on Matt Murdock's heroic identity, which gives Daredevils supporting characters a clearer purpose as well." IGN reviewer Matt Fowler, after reviewing all the episodes of season two individually, gave the season a 9.3 out of 10, saying that it "excelled at both action and story while giving us a more complex and layered season than the first....Gone was a notable 'main villain', but instead we were given fantastic performances by not only the main cast but by newcomers Jon Bernthal and Elodie Yung."

Jack Shepherd of The Independent was slightly more critical of the early episodes of the season, saying the ideological battle between Murdock and Castle "is the crux of these first few episodes and also highlights the main problem with Daredevil" pointing out that "there is no real bad guy here" and there "is only so many times you can watch an episode end with Daredevil and Punisher beating each other up before you start thinking there is a glitch in the Matrix." He also agreed with Fitzpatick regarding Curtis-Hall's presence as Ben Urich not being filled in the season. Despite this, Shepherd added that the season began to pick up by the fourth episode, with the introduction of Elektra, capping with episodes six and seven, which he called "by far the season's best, laying the foundation for an exciting story ahead", while also praising Cox, Henson, Woll, Bernthal and Yung for their performances. Daniel Fienberg, reviewing the first seven episodes for The Hollywood Reporter, expressed similar sentiments as Shepherd, feeling the episodes missed what Vincent D'Onofrio brought as Wilson Fisk in the first season, or at least "the through-line threat that he presented...Fortunately, the [Punisher and Elektra] are vividly realized and the action is still visceral and brutal and maybe the big picture will emerge in the season's second half. Because of the portrayals of those two characters, he felt "that there's a challenge to remain wholly invested in plotlines that don't involve them". Despite being "right on the edge of desensitization" regarding the fight scenes, Fienberg still praised them, highlighting the different styles Elektra and the Punisher used "vary[ing] the dynamic enough".

Entertainment Weeklys Jeff Jensen award the season a "C", calling it "a straight-up disappointment." Calling the early episodes with Daredevil's face-off with the Punisher "skimpy and sluggish from the get-go", Jensen also added that they were "a flatline of inert drama, with long scenes of windy exposition or dull skulking interrupted by the occasional well-staged if ridiculously gory fight sequence." Jensen added that "hope for improvement" came with the introduction of Elektra, and that the sixth episode should be a template for the rest of the season, which ultimately, he felt was "stiff and silly." Daniel D'Addario for Time was also disappointed with the season, saying, "it's hard not to feel that one is being taken for a long, and not particularly enjoyable, ride... Daredevil just wants to dole out fun doses of extreme gore on the path to an endpoint on a business plan. Any viewer committed to story is left searching in the dark." Vulture's Abraham Riesman joined the criticism, calling the seven episodes reviewed "a dour parade of one cliché after another, recycling themes, images, and rhetoric that audiences have seen countless times before." Though he wouldn't call it "", he felt that with all the other superhero content released in the same year, "it feels woefully unnecessary." However, he did praise Bernthal's performance, saying it was "another excitingly sympathetic antagonist" after D'Onofrio's "standout performance" as Fisk in the first season, but was "nowhere near as fun". In contrast to the first season of Jessica Jones, which Riseman called Marvel's "first attempt to depict sex in any kind of realistic way", he called the second season of Daredevil "astoundingly un-sexy."

Accolades
Got Your 6, which "champions positive portrayals of military veterans in Hollywood", deemed "Semper Fidelis" to be "6 Certified" for "responsibly and accurately portray[ing] veterans via the character of Frank Castle, The Punisher, who insists that his legal representation not perpetuate veteran stereotypes of PTSD in order to defend his actions". Daredevil was included on Hidden Remote's Best TV Series of 2016 list, ranking 4th. Comic Book Resources named "Seven Minutes in Heaven" and "Penny and Dime" as the 12th and 2nd best episodes in 2016 among comic book-related television series, respectively.

References

External links
 
 

2016 American television seasons
02
Punisher in other media
Martyrdom in fiction
Works about Irish-American organized crime